The Stubbornness of Geraldine is a 1915 American silent film directed by Gaston Mervale adapted from a play by Clyde Fitch.

External links

Full text of play

1915 films
American black-and-white films
American silent feature films
1915 drama films
Silent American drama films
Films directed by Gaston Mervale
1910s American films